Ángel Sánchez Baró (born 28 July 1997) is a Spanish footballer who plays for CD Tudelano as a winger.

Football career
Born in Palma, Majorca, Balearic Islands, Sánchez was a RCD Mallorca youth graduate. He made his senior debut with the reserves on 21 April 2014, coming on as a late substitute for Brandon in a 3–1 Tercera División away win against CD Atlético Rafal.

On 19 December 2015 Sánchez scored his first senior goals, as well as his first hat-trick, netting four times in a 5–1 home routing of SCR Peña Deportiva. He contributed with 19 appearances and five goals during the campaign, as his side achieved promotion to the Segunda División B.

On 6 January 2017 Sánchez made his first-team debut, replacing fellow youth graduate James in a 2–0 home win against CD Mirandés in the Segunda División.

On 14 May 2018 Sánchez had a trial with Liverpool U23s scoring the winning goal against Panjab FA. On 9 July, he signed a two-year deal with another reserve team, RCD Espanyol B of the third division.

References

External links

1997 births
Living people
Footballers from Palma de Mallorca
Spanish footballers
Association football wingers
Segunda División players
Segunda División B players
Tercera División players
RCD Mallorca B players
RCD Mallorca players
RCD Espanyol B footballers
CF Badalona players
Salamanca CF UDS players
Barakaldo CF footballers
CD Tudelano footballers